Gephyromantis granulatus, commonly known as the grainy Madagascar frog, is a species of frog in the family Mantellidae.  It is endemic to Madagascar.  Its natural habitats are subtropical or tropical moist lowland forests, plantations, and heavily degraded former forest.

References

granulatus
Endemic fauna of Madagascar
Taxonomy articles created by Polbot
Amphibians described in 1881